Robert Learn Jr. (born April 4, 1962) is a professional ten-pin bowler and bowling coach. He formerly competed on the Professional Bowlers Association (PBA) Tour and is currently active on the PBA50 Tour. He is nicknamed "Mr. 300", having rolled over 100 perfect games between PBA and sanctioned USBC competition.

Learn Jr. is a member of the Brunswick pro staff.

Bowling career
Learn became a PBA member in 1981, bowling mostly in PBA Regional Tour events until joining the national PBA Tour full-time in 1984. He won five PBA Tour titles during his career, including a major at the 1999 U.S. Open, but is most noted for:

 Rolling the PBA's 10th televised 300 game in the opening match of the final round at the PBA Flagship Open.  The event was held in Learn's hometown of Erie, Pennsylvania, on April 6, 1996.
 Setting the all-time PBA record for total pins in a four-game TV final at the same event.  Learn shot games of 300, 270, 280 and 279 for a total of 1,129. This shattered the previous PBA record of 1,070 pins, set in 1995 by David Ozio. In the four matches, Learn recorded 44 of a possible 48 strikes.

Learn's fifth and final PBA Tour title came in 2001 at the Dydo Japan Cup. He also has ten career runner-up finishes on the PBA Tour, and has earned over $1 million in PBA events.

Originally from Erie, Pennsylvania, Learn now resides in Spring Hill, Tennessee. He joined the PBA Senior Tour (renamed the PBA50 Tour) in 2012, and has three titles on that Tour to date. He also has 25 PBA Regional Tour titles and three PBA50 Regional Tour titles.

PBA Tour titles 
Major championships in bold.

 1992 Fair Lanes Open (Baltimore, Maryland)
 1993 Bud Light Hall of Fame Championship (Richmond Heights, Missouri)
 1996 Flagship Open (Erie, Pennsylvania)
 1999 U.S. Open (Uncasville, Connecticut)
 2001 Dydo Japan Cup (Tokyo, Japan)

PBA50 Tour titles 
 2012 PBA Senior Mooresville Classic (Mooresville, North Carolina)
 2013 PBA50 Pasco County Suncoast Open (New Port Richey, Florida)
 2015 PBA/PBA50 South Shore Doubles w/DJ Archer (Hammond, Indiana)

Coaching career 
In May 2017, Learn Jr., with over 25 years of coaching experience, accepted the position of head men's and women's bowling coach for the Martin Methodist RedHawks in Pulaski, Tennessee. He was named NAIA Men's Bowling Coach of the Year in the 2019–20 and 2020–21 seasons.

Learn also created TurboTech Collegiate Expo, which he designed specifically for college recruitment. He has conducted numerous bowling clinics around the world and has been a past coach for Team USA.

In 2020, Learn was named manager of the expansion Miami Waves PBA League team.

References

American ten-pin bowling players
1962 births
Living people
Sportspeople from Erie, Pennsylvania
Sportspeople from Boynton Beach, Florida